The Little Band scene was an experimental post-punk scene which flourished in Melbourne, Victoria, Australia from late 1978 until early 1981. Instigated by groups Primitive Calculators and Whirlywhirld, this scene was concentrated in the inner suburbs of Fitzroy and St Kilda, and involved large numbers of short-lived bands, more concerned with artistic expression than commercial success. Frequently changing names, swapping members and sharing equipment, the bands played in small inner-city venues, often pubs, and their music was recorded live and broadcast by radio announcer Alan Bamford on community station 3RRR. In the scene, the distinctions between performers and audience were blurred; many audience members were either in little bands or ended up forming such.

The scene served as the backdrop for the 1986 cult film Dogs in Space.

History

In 1978, members of Primitive Calculators, an experimental post-punk group from Melbourne, formed a short-lived side band, the Leapfrogs. Using it as their own opening act, they decided to form other "little bands" with friends, including members of Whirlywirld, who lived next door to the group in Fitzroy North, with rehearsal spaces in each house. The little bands grew in number, sharing instruments and equipment, and the term "North Fitzroy Beat" was coined to describe their sound. Soon they started staging "Little Band Nights" at various inner city venues, notably the Champion Hotel in Fitzroy, the Crystal Ballroom in St Kilda and the Exford in Chinatown, with occasional appearances in Carlton, Collingwood and Richmond. At first, strict rules were imposed: no little band was allowed to play more than twice and could have no more than fifteen minutes worth of material. According to Primitive Calculators frontman Stuart Grant, it was "the punk ethos of disposability, novelty and working against the grain of the standard modes of procedure in the music business."

Many of the little bands were composed of painters, poets, filmmakers, performance artists, and other non-musicians who enjoyed the opportunity to realise their naive musical ideas. Little band member John Murphy explained that "a lot of the original participants were artists who applied the Dada sort of approach of their painting". One journalist described the little bands' output as "sloppy, clangy and discordant. By turns, they could sound equally fantastic: a mixture of epileptic drum machine rhythms, stabbing synth lines and creepy/witty lyrics making for oddly compelling results." Some members of the scene had received proper training in electronic music and composition, including Whirlywirld's Ollie Olsen, who studied under Melbourne-based composer Felix Werder.

Little band member and radio announcer Alan Bamford began recording Little Band Nights using a TEAC reel-to-reel tape recorder and a Shure microphone. Immediately following each gig, he caught a tram to 3RRR's Fitzroy premises, where he broadcast the tapes on his midnight show. The scene continued to grow, and at later nights, up to ten little bands would perform. The little bands interacted with other distinct post-punk scenes in Melbourne, such as the St Kilda scene centred at the Crystal Ballroom, where they occasionally supported The Birthday Party and Crime & the City Solution. The "wild and chaotic" nature of the little bands stood in stark contrast to "the more academic form of experimentalism" of Tsk Tsk Tsk, Essendon Airport, Ernie Althoff, David Chesworth, and others associated with the Clifton Hill scene. According to Murphy, the little bands reviled the "Clifton Hill mob" for being against emotion in music, while Tsk Tsk Tsk founder Philip Brophy regarded the Little Band scene as anti-intellectual, and its music "harsh and sometimes painful".

After the Calculators and Whirlywirld left Melbourne for Europe and London in early 1980, the Little Band scene centred on the shared spaces of Use No Hooks and The Incredibly Strange Creatures Who Stopped Living and Became Mixed Up Zombies. The scene had effectively ended by early 1981.

Aftermath

Several lasting musical partnerships were forged in the scene: Lisa Gerrard and Brendan Perry went on to achieve international fame as Dead Can Dance; members of the Jetsonnes regrouped to form Hunters & Collectors; Kim Beissel and Chris Astley joined the Melbourne incarnation of Crime & the City Solution; and the Serious Young Insects later became Boom Crash Opera. Zorros also formed out of an impromptu jam during one of the Champion Hotel's Little Band Nights in early 1980.

Recordings and releases
Alan Bamford collaborated with Max Robenstone, owner of Climax Records in Fitzroy, in paying for the pressing of Little Bands (1980), an EP featuring studio recordings by Morpions, Ronnie and the Rhythm Boys, The Take and Too Fat to Fit Through the Door. The first phase of the scene—up to the departure of the Calculators and Whirlywirld—was documented on an unreleased double LP, No Sin Like Dancing, that is catalogued in Clinton Walker's 1981 book Inner City Sound. Several little bands can also be found on the 1981 One Stop Shopping compilation curated by Severed Heads member Tom Ellard and released through Terse Tapes, as well as on issues of Fast Forward (1980–82), a cassette magazine founded and edited by Bruce Milne of Au Go Go Records. Bootleg copies of Alan Bamford's live recordings of the little bands are also known to exist.

Since the scene ended, little band recordings have appeared on Chapter Music releases, including the 2007 Primitive Calculators and Friends CD, the Can't Stop It! compilation series, and The Job (2020), which features previously unreleased Use No Hooks recordings. In 2016, German label Vinyl On Demand released Magnetophonics: Australian Underground Music 1978–1984, featuring several little bands.

Legacy and influence

Influenced by the little bands concept in Melbourne, post-punk group Pel Mel started a similar scene in Sydney in 1980.

The Little Band scene was represented, albeit semi-fictionally, in the 1986 cult film Dogs in Space, directed by Richard Lowenstein and starring INXS frontman Michael Hutchence. Primitive Calculators briefly reformed to star in the film, playing a new version of their song "Pumping Ugly Muscle". Original little band Thrush and the Cunts also appear with the song "Diseases", and little band figurehead Marie Hoy performs a cover of "Shivers" by the Boys Next Door. The live music scenes were supervised by Whirlywirld's Ollie Olsen, who also appears in the film. Coinciding with the film's long-awaited re-release, Lowenstein revisited Dogs in Space, the Little Band scene and Melbourne post-punk in general in the 2009 documentary We're Livin' on Dog Food, featuring rare footage and interviews with various members of the scene.

In 2010, the Melbourne Fringe Festival staged two shows dedicated to Little Band scene's ethos of ephemerality. Participants included members of contemporary bands the Boat People, the Crayon Fields, the Devastations, Dick Diver and Pikelet, among others. Chapter Music's Guy Blackman also participated, as well as members of Primitive Calculators with special guests the Take, an original little band which reformed for the first time in 30 years. Since then, several Melbourne venues, including The Tote, have helped to revive the little bands concept with shows headlined by the reformed Primitive Calculators.

List of little bands
Bands listed in bold went on to become fully fledged gigging groups.

 $2.50
 66 Johnsons
 The Alan Bamford Musical Experience
 The Albert Hammond Megastar
 The Art Circus
 Bags of Personality
 The Band of Hope and Glory
 The Beaumaris Tennis Club Quartet
 BeisselBoyceBoswell
 The Buck Stops Here
 The Child Molestor + 4
 Clang
 Club Allusion
 Company I Keep
 Consider Town Planning
 Corporate Body
 Delicatessants
 The Devils
 The Eastwood Family
 The Egg
 The Franging Stuttgarters
 The Great Mastabini
 The Go Set
 Government Drums
 Hey There
 The Incredible Metronomic Blues Band
 The Incredibly Strange Creatures Who Stopped Living and Became Mixed Up Zombies
 Intro Muzak Band
 The Irreplacables
 The Ivan Durrants
 Invisible Music
 The J P Sartre Band
 The Jetsonnes
 Jim Buck Solo
 Jimmy Haemorrhoid and the Piles
 Junk Logic
 Kim and Mark
 The Klu
 The Leapfrogs
 Lest We Forget
 The Lunatic Fringe
 The Melbourne SS
 Morpions
 The Nookies
 The Oroton Bags
 The Pastel Bats
 The Persons Brothers
 People With Chairs Up Their Noses
 The Potato Cooperative
 The Quits
 Rosehip and the Teas
 Ralf Horrors
 Ronnie and the Rhythm Boys
 Sample Only
 The Sandmen
 The Saxophone Caper
 Seaside Resort
 Serious Young Insects
 Shop Soiled
 The Shower Scene From Psycho
 Simplex
 Small Men Big Cars
 Somersaulting Consciences
 The Soporifics
 The Spanish Inquisition
 Stand by Your Guns
 The Swinging Hoy Family
 The Take
 Tarax Show
 Three Toed Sloths
 Thrush and the Cunts
 Too Fat to Fit Through the Door
 Too Many Daves
 Use No Hooks
 World of Sport

See also

 Culture of Melbourne
 Music of Melbourne

References

Further reading

External links
ABC Radio National's Hindsight – Do That Dance! Australian Post Punk 1977–1983
3RRR Max Headroom Special – Little Bands
The History of the Melbourne Punk Scene – The Little Bands

Australian styles of music
Australian fringe and underground culture
Culture of Melbourne
Post-punk
Music scenes